Brilliant were a British pop/rock group active in the 1980s. Although not commercially successful and mauled by the critics, they remain notable because of the personnel involved – Martin Glover a.k.a. Youth of Killing Joke and subsequently a top producer/remixer; Jimmy Cauty, later to find fame and fortune as one half of The KLF; and (prior to the band signing with WEA) Ben Watkins a.k.a. Juno Reactor. Equally notable was their management (David Balfe), their record company A&R manager (Bill Drummond, the other member of The KLF), and songwriting and production team (Mike Stock, Matt Aitken and Pete Waterman known as Stock Aitken Waterman).

Career
Brilliant started in 1982 as post-punk band Killing Joke was crumbling under internal conflicts. Unsatisfied with his bandmates' following of the occult lifestyle, Killing Joke's bass player Youth decided to call it quits and recorded an angry slandering song against his former bandmates. The song, "That's What Good Friends Are For...", a mock of Killing Joke's second album What's THIS for...!, was credited to "Brilliant", which was a name of a Killing Joke B-side and a general 1980s buzzword.

For the first incarnation of Brilliant as a full band, Youth recruited Marcus Myers on vocals and guitar, who left as the record deal was about to be signed, the only vocalist until June Montana took over from backing vocals, (joined Hard Rain, Then Jericho, Alishas Attic) a second bass player Guy Pratt (who left for the Australian band Icehouse and was replaced by Frenchman Stephane "Tin Tin" Holweck prior to their first live performances), and the two drummers Andy Anderson (The Cure) and Peter Ogi, along with synthesist Rob Waugh. They released two singles, "That's What Good Friends Are For..."/"Push" (Limelight Music LIME 001/A/B with a sleeve by Mark Alleyne) and "Colours" (through Rough Trade Records with a sleeve by Mark Manning). They recorded a BBC session for John Peel on 11 October 1982 with a lineup of Youth, Myers, Tin Tin, Anderson and Ogi. Overall through its four years of existence the band included roughly 30 players until reducing to the trio of Youth, Cauty and female vocalist June Montana.

The debut single with this lineup, a cover of James Brown's "It's a Man's Man's World", was critically acclaimed by the music press, and became the group's biggest hit on the UK Singles Chart, albeit only peaking at No. 58 in October 1985. The group released their only album Kiss the Lips of Life in 1986, and three further singles, "Love Is War" (UK No. 64), "Somebody" (UK No. 67) and a cover of "The End of the World". The album was produced by the British production team Stock Aitken & Waterman (except the song "Crash the Car"), but it only peaked at No. 83 in the UK Albums Chart. The album was reissued on CD by independent U.S. record label, Wounded Bird, on 11 August 2009.

Speaking of the creative process of recording the album with SAW, Youth said, "We’d be cowriting with them, starting a new song, and Pete Waterman would come in with a handful of New York import 12”s with him, and he’d go to the record player and say, 'Right, that’s the fuckin' bassline!', and then he'd play another record and go, 'That’s the beat!’. Then he'd play another record, it's Cyndi Lauper, and he'd go, 'That's the melody!"

"It was that Picasso thing; don’t borrow, steal it. I loved that. And that got me and Jimmy thinking, let’s go further and sample it, and make the music from other people’s records."

Speaking of Brilliant's final single, a cover of "The End of The World," which failed to chart at all, June and Youth expressed reservations over the choice of the song, with the singer suggesting the release had been a half-hearted effort released at the behest of the record company.

"I just thought it was schmaltz," Youth added. "Bill [Drummond] really pushed for that."

Following the commercial failure of the band's debut album, WEA failed to pick up Brilliant's contract for renewal. But when the act were offered a lucrative new deal with Polydor, WEA took them to court and forced an extension of their contract, which the label argued had only not been picked up due to an administrative oversight. 

Despite forcing a continuation of the band's contract, WEA did not release any further material by Brilliant, leaving Youth to pursue a career as a producer and writer.

The band split in late 1986, but group members continued working with each other on subsequent years. Jimmy Cauty and Bill Drummond formed The KLF in 1987. June Montana formed the female duo Disco 2000 with Cauty's wife Cressida, releasing several singles on the KLF Communications label. Youth and Cauty worked together again in the band The Orb.

Reviews
Trouser Press reviewer Ira Robbins called Kiss the Lips of Life "dismal" and the band "cynical" and "wretched", adding that "[their] lasting cultural significance amounts to its inclusion of ex-Zodiac Mindwarp keyboardist/guitarist Jimmy Cauty, with whom [Bill] Drummond concocted the Justified Ancients of Mu Mu (JAMs)".

AllMusic were a little more generous, calling Brilliant an initially "promising act: a more soulful take on the aggressive funk-rock of Killing Joke" but added that, after being teamed up with Stock, Aitken and Waterman, they "came up with a generic pop-dance album that fell well short of the original concept". Awarding Kiss the Lips of Life two stars out of five, they added that "What aggression there is comes courtesy of Jimmy Cauty's metallic guitar solos; the sterile synth whitewash of SAW dominates the rest of the mix, and vocalist June Montana isn't strong or distinctive enough to fight through it".

However, even Bill Drummond – the A&R man who had signed them – had harsh words to say about the project: "I signed a band called Brilliant, who I worked with, we worked together, and it was complete failure. Artistically bankrupt project. And financially deaf. We spent £300,000 on making an album that was useless. Useless artistically, useless... commercially."

"We did a record with this band called Brilliant, the reviews were phenomenal and it got to 58 in the charts. I remember saying to the guys, fuck that for critically acclaimed music, you can't pay the fucking rent with that." – Pete Waterman

Discography

Albums
Kiss the Lips of Life, 1986 UK (WEA/Food Records) U.S. (Atlantic) (No. 83 UK Albums Chart)

Singles
"That's What Good Friends Are For..." (Brilliant)/"Push" (Brilliant), 1982 UK (Limelight Music Lime-7-001) (UK Indie No. 22)
"Colours" (A.Anderson/M.Glover/M.Myer/S.Holweck)/"Colours Monster Mix" – 1983 UK (Risk Records/Rough Trade, RTT105) (UK Indie No. 11)
"Soul Murder", 1984 UK (Food Records) (UK Indie No. 14)
"Wait for It", 1984 UK (WEA/Food Records)
"It's a Man's Man's Man's World", 1985 UK (WEA/Food Records) (No. 58 UK Singles Chart)
"Love Is War" (Youth/Montana/Cauty/Stock/Aitken/Waterman) / "The Red Red Groovy" (Youth/Montana/Cauty) / "Ruby Fruit Jungle" (Youth/Montana/Cauty/Holwick/Le Mesurier), 1986 UK (WEA/Food Records, FOOD 6) (No. 64 UK Singles Chart)
"Somebody", 1986 UK (WEA/Food Records) U.S. (Atlantic) (No. 67 UK Singles Chart)
"The End of the World", 1986 UK (WEA/Food Records)

References

Footnotes

External links
Listen to "It's a Man's Man's Man's World" by Brilliant 

English dance music groups
English new wave musical groups
English rock music groups
Musical groups from London
Bill Drummond
Jimmy Cauty
Killing Joke
Musical groups established in 1983
Musical groups disestablished in 1986